Boatswain's Mate William C. Connor (1832–1912) was an Irish soldier who fought in the American Civil War. He was honored with the award on 31 December 1864.

Biography
Connor was born in Cork, Ireland in 1832. He enlisted into the United States Navy.

Medal of Honor citation

See also

List of American Civil War Medal of Honor recipients: A–F

References

1832 births
1912 deaths
American Civil War recipients of the Medal of Honor
Irish emigrants to the United States
Irish-born Medal of Honor recipients
People of Pennsylvania in the American Civil War
Union Navy officers
United States Navy Medal of Honor recipients
People from Cork (city)